Çağrı Coşkun (born April 23, 1984 in İzmir, Turkey) is a Turkish professional motorcycle racer. He competes in the 600cc A category of the Turkish Championship.

Gaining a wildcard, Coşkun started in grid 34 at the 2013 Supersport World Championship's İstanbul Park round for Pacific Racing Team on Honda CBR600RR and raced without reaching the finish line.

Racing record

Supersport World Championship
(key)

 * Season still in progress.

References

1984 births
Sportspeople from İzmir
Living people
Supersport World Championship riders
Turkish motorcycle racers